John Allen Sterling (February 1, 1857 – October 17, 1918) was a U.S. Representative from Illinois, and brother of Thomas Sterling.

Early life and education
Born to Charles Sterling (1821-1905) and Anna Kessler (1827-1908) near Le Roy in McLean County, Illinois, Sterling attended the public schools, and graduated from the Illinois Wesleyan University in Bloomington in 1881. He was superintendent of the public schools of Lexington, Illinois (now Lexington Community Unit School District 7) from 1881 to 1883.

Career
He studied law, was admitted to the bar in December 1884, and commenced law practice in Bloomington. He was the state's attorney of McLean County from 1892 to 1896, and a member of the Republican state central committee from 1896-1898.

Sterling was elected as a Republican to the Fifty-eighth through Sixty-second Congresses (March 4, 1903–March 3, 1913). He was one of the managers appointed by the House of Representatives in 1912 to conduct the impeachment proceedings against Robert W. Archbald, judge of the United States Commerce Court. He lost re-election to the Sixty-third Congress, but was re-elected to the Sixty-fourth and Sixty-fifth Congresses and served from March 4, 1915 until his death near Pontiac, Illinois, as the result of an automobile accident on October 17, 1918.

Death
He was interred in Park Hill Cemetery, Bloomington, Illinois.

See also
List of United States Congress members who died in office (1900–49)

References

External links
 
 
 John A. Sterling, late a representative from Illinois, Memorial addresses delivered in the House of Representatives and Senate frontispiece 1920

1857 births
1918 deaths
People from McLean County, Illinois
Illinois lawyers
Illinois Wesleyan University alumni
District attorneys in Illinois
School superintendents in Illinois
Road incident deaths in Illinois
Republican Party members of the United States House of Representatives from Illinois
19th-century American politicians
People from Bloomington, Illinois
Educators from Illinois
19th-century American lawyers